Llewellyn Jones (1840–1918) was the fourth Anglican Bishop of Newfoundland.

Life
Jones was born in Liverpool, England, on 11 October 1840. He was consecrated Bishop of Newfoundland on 1 May 1878 by Archbishop Tait of Canterbury, with Bishops Jackson (London) and Atlay (Hereford) assisting. His predecessor, James Kelly, had resigned in 1877 due an aversion to sailing.

Jones arrived at St. John's on 4 June. He was installed the Bishop of Newfoundland by the Revd Thomas M. Wood, who was the bishop's commissary.

Following the devastating fire of 1892, Jones rebuilt the Cathedral of St. John the Baptist.

The Great Fire of 1892 in St. John's destroyed much of the city and extensively damaged the cathedral. The only stained-glass windows to survive the disaster were in the sacristy off the right of the main altar where the vestments were stored. Three years later the difficult task of reconstruction began. Restoration work continued under the guidance of the diocese's fourth bishop, Llewellyn Jones, and was not finished until 1905.

Jones died on 9 January 1918.

References

External links
Bishops of Newfoundland
Religion in Newfoundland before 1949
Bishop Jones Will
Installed Bishop by the Rev'd. Thomas Wood.
Consecrated 1878 by Archbishop Tait.

1840 births
1917 deaths
Anglican bishops of Newfoundland
19th-century Anglican Church of Canada bishops
20th-century Anglican Church of Canada bishops